Bill Mondy, sometimes credited as Bill Monday, is an American film and television actor.

Career
He is best known for his appearances in Star Trek: Deep Space Nine (in the episode "Armageddon Game") and The Dead Zone. He also made guest appearances in Wolf Lake and The 4400.

Filmography

Film
 Last Exit to Brooklyn (1989) as Uptown Doggie
 Meet the Deedles (also known as The Deedles) (1998)
 The Crow: Salvation (also known as The Crow III – Tödliche Erlösung on German DVD) (2000) as Phillip Dutton
 Snowbound (also known as White Lies in Canada) (2001) as Wiley
 The Burial Society (2002) as Stuart Lightman
 I Spy (2002) as McIntyre
 The Dead Zone (2002, Video) as Roscoe
 Miracle (2004) as Lou Nanne
 Scooby-Doo 2: Monsters Unleashed (2004) as Vomit Reporter
 Edison (2005) as Public Defender
 Chaos (2005) as FBI Agent Doyle
 Gray Matters (2006) as Jordan Phillips
 Kickin' It Old Skool (2007) as TV Bigwig
 Postal (2007) as Mob Leader
 The Day the Earth Stood Still (2008) as Helicopter Scientist #2
 Case 39 (2009) as Interviewer
 Barbie in the Pink Shoes (2013) as Rothbart / Thorpe / Peasant (voice)

Television
Television film

 Unabomber: The True Story (also known as Unabomber) (1996)
 In My Sister's Shadow (1997) as Mr. Connor
 Before He Wakes (1998) as Winston Becker
 The Perfect Getaway (1998) as Agent Lawrence
 A Wing and a Prayer (1998) as Coach Passenger
 Murder at 75 Birch (1999) as Stan
 A Secret Life (also known as Breach of Trust in United Kingdom)  (2000)
 Dead in a Heartbeat (2002) as Patient
 Meltdown (2004) as FBI Agent Tucci
 The Survivors Club (2004) as Jack Collins
 The Secret of Hidden Lake (2006) as Zack Roth

Television Series

 L.A. Law (1990) as Paul Zweibel
 Star Trek: Deep Space Nine (1994) as Jakin
 Promised Land (1997–1999, 2 episodes) as Mr. Beckwith / Coop Lemley
 Crusade (1999) as Nix
 Da Vinci's Inquest (2000) as Philip Simms
 Perfect Murder, Perfect Town (2000, miniseries) as Ron Walker
 Touched by an Angel (2000) as Bernie
 Mobile Suit Gundam (2001) as Slegger Law (English voice)
 The Sausage Factory (2001) as Coach Gardener
 UC: Undercover (2001–2002, 3 episodes) as Scott Charles
 Wolf Lake (2001) as Vernon Dicky
 Pasadena (2002, 2 episodes) as Teacher
 Smallville (2002, 2006, 2008, 2009) as James Beales and Dr. Edward Groll
 The Dead Zone (2003–2006, 32 episodes) as Roscoe
 Just Cause (2003) as I.N.S. Agent Glasgow
 The L Word (2004) as Movie Type
 The 4400 (2005) as Agent Hubbard
 Andromeda (2005) as Stranger
 Reunion (2005, 5 episodes) as Detective Matos
 Terminal City (2005, miniseries) as Frank
 Transformers: Cybertron (2005-2006) as Evac (voice)
 Johnny Test (2005–2014, cartoon series) as Mr. Black / Brain Freezer (voice)
 Blade (2006) as Detective Brian Boone
 Pucca (2006-2008) as Clown (voice)
 George of the Jungle (2007) as Mantler (voice)
 Jibber Jabber (2007) as Jelly Roll / Dad (voice)
 Dinosaur Train (2009, animated series, Episode: "Einiosaurus") as Uncle Jack (voice)
 Dreamkix (2010, animated series) as Leonardo
 The First 48: Missing Persons (2011) as Narrator
 My Little Pony: Friendship Is Magic (2017) as Burnt Oak

External links

Place of birth missing (living people)
Year of birth missing (living people)
Living people
American male film actors
American male television actors
American male voice actors
20th-century American male actors
21st-century American male actors